Live at the Point is a live album by Seattle musician Shawn Smith.  It was recorded at The Point in Philadelphia.  Smith plays piano or guitar and sings on all tracks, with no other accompaniment.  Smith has described this as his "best live vocal performance ever captured".

For detailed info on each version of this release, see Shawn Smith's Official Website

Track listing
"My Very Best" *
"Someday" *
"Not Too Late" **
"Let It All Begin" *
"Sometimes It Snows In April" (Prince and the Revolution cover)
"A Little Heart" (unreleased original)
"Screen" ***
"On The Banks" *
"The Day Brings" ***
"Buttercup" ***
"Suffering" **

* from Let It All Begin
** originally recorded with Satchel
*** originally recorded with Brad

References

Shawn Smith albums
2000 live albums